Pediasia pudibundellus is a species of moth in the family Crambidae described by Gottlieb August Wilhelm Herrich-Schäffer in 1852. It is found in southern Russia (Sarepta and Uralsk).

References

Moths described in 1852
Crambini
Moths of Europe